Mirtha Reid (1918–1981) was  a Uruguayan stage and film actress. She was born as María Luisa Queirolo in Uruguay, but spent most of her career in Argentina where she adopted her stage name. She acted predominantly in the theatre, but also appeared in a handful of films.

Selected filmography
 A Doll's House (1943)

References

Bibliography 
 Malfatti, Arnaldo. Teatro argentino contemporáneo.  Aguilar, 1960.

External links 
 

1918 births
1981 deaths
Uruguayan stage actresses
Uruguayan film actresses
20th-century Uruguayan actresses
Uruguayan expatriates in Argentina